Facey is a surname. Notable people with the surname include:

Albert Facey (1894–1982), Australian writer and World War I veteran, whose main work was his autobiography, A Fortunate Life
Danny Facey, Grenadian international footballer who plays for English club Ossett Town, as a striker
Delroy Facey (born 1980), British-Grenadian professional footballer
Fred Facey (1930–2003), American radio and television announcer
Hugh Facey, also known as Hugh Facy or Hugh Facio, (fl. 1618), English composer from the Renaissance
Simone Facey (born 1985), Jamaican sprinter who specializes in the 100 metres
Tom Facey, Democratic member of the Montana Legislature

See also
Bev Facey Community High School, public high school for grades 10–12 in Sherwood Park, Alberta
Harvey v Facey, contract law case decided by the United Kingdom Judicial Committee of the Privy Council